Manila Baywalk Dolomite Beach, commonly known as Dolomite Beach, is an artificial beach along Manila Bay in Manila, Philippines created through the process of beach nourishment. It is part of an overall integrated coastal zone management aimed at coastal defense of the Manila Bay Rehabilitation project. When completed, the beach will cover a total length of 900 meters of Manila Baywalk.

Background 
Dolomite Beach is a project of the Department of Environment and Natural Resources (DENR). It is a part of the Manila Bay Rehabilitation Program launched by Secretary Roy Cimatu in January 2019. It is an integral part of the integrated coastal zone management aimed at coastal defense of the Manila Bay Rehabilitation. Budget for the project was approved prior to the COVID-19 pandemic. It was allocated for the beach nourishment, coastal restoration and enhancement of the Manila Baywalk area. Works on the project began in August 2020, when the government issued a permit to Philippine Mining Service Corporation to transport crushed dolomite from Alcoy, Cebu to Manila. Dolomite mining operations were suspended in September 2020.

Beach 
Dolomite Beach was created through the process of beach nourishment, which a common practice in the creation of beaches around the world. Upon the extraction of debris in the  portion of the baywalk from the Manila Yacht Club to the United States Embassy in Manila, the project proponents dumped two layers of ordinary sand before overlaying it with crushed dolomite.

The beach was first opened to the public from September 19 to 20, 2020. Afterwards, it was closed again for expansion. Originally, the beach was to be completed by December 2020, but it was pushed back in 2021. On January 17, 2021, DENR Undersecretary Benny Antiporda stated that the overlaying of crushed dolomite for a 500-meter portion of the beach will take one to two months to complete.

After the onslaught of Typhoon Vamco (Ulysses) in November, the beach was dumped with garbage, with the DENR denying reports that the dolomite was washed away, saying that black sand was washed in to the beach. After a series of typhoons in late 2020, the DENR replenished the beach with a new batch of crushed dolomite rock.

A new coat of dolomite sand was laid over the beach in April 2021.

On July 18, 2021, the beach was reopened to the public without an announcement. By September 2021, an entrance arch was installed bearing the name of the site: "Manila Baywalk Dolomite Beach". The beach was opened again on October 17, 2021. The beach was reopened again on June 12, 2022 after it was closed again for expansion.

Design 
The beach nourishment project was carried out by the Department of Public Works and Highways (DPWH) in coordination with the DENR and is a part of the Manila Bay Rehabilitation. The whole project, which consists of the beach nourishment, coastal restoration and enhancement of the Manila Baywalk area covers the whole area starting from the southernmost tip of the US Embassy up to the Breakwater of the Manila Yacht Club. The DPWH plans to build a new breakwater, in addition to geotubes, to protect the beach from storm surges and prevent the dolomite sands from washing out. The proposed breakwater will also protect low-lying areas in Manila, Pasay, Las Piñas and Parañaque.

Impact 

According to the Mines and Geosciences Bureau, the project will benefit tourism, commerce and the environment. It will also protect coastal properties from erosion and storm surges and beach nourishment are preferred projects over hard beach stabilizing structures (such as seawalls and groynes). The Department of Health released a statement that the use of dolomite is not a known health hazard.

Environment 
The Department of Environment and Natural Resources has maintained that the dolomite used to create the beach poses no harm to Manila Bay's ecosystem. The laying of dolomite has been suspected as a possible cause for a fish kill on September 17, 2020, near the waters of the Baseco Compound.

As with other beach nourishment projects, the area can serve as additional habitat for a number of species such as sea turtles, as well as sea birds and beach flora. When the beach was first opened to the public, a flock of egrets were seen at the beach area.

Water quality 
In February 2021, the Department of Environment and Natural Resources reported significant drop of fecal coliform level in the waters around the beach. Fecal coliform level in Manila Bay dropped from 7.16 million most probable number per 100 milliliters (mpn/100ml) in 2020 to 4.87 million mpn/100ml in February 2021, while the fecal coliform level around the beach has dropped from 2.2 million mpn/100ml last January 4 to 523,000 mpn/100 ml on February 8, based on the average count from three monitoring stations. However, the level is still far from the ideal 100 mpn/100ml for coastal waters.

By June 2022, two water quality monitoring stations near the beach registered lower fecal coliform levels – from 7,300 MPN/100mL to 1,700 MPN/100mL, and from 10,200 MPN/100mL to 2,100 MPN/100mL, respectively.

Reception 

The project has received support from the Manila city government led by Mayor Isko Moreno. President Rodrigo Duterte also voiced his support to the project. Likewise, Secretary Roy Cimatu, seeing the throngs of people during the September 2020 opening, said that the project received the overwhelming support of the general public. On its partial opening in September, people crowded the beach and the nearby area that physical distancing were not properly observed. Vloggers have been posting positive updates regarding the project, which DENR Undersecretary Benny Antiporda cited as an "effective way in informing the public" about the project.

However, the project received criticism from activists, environmentalists, and heritage conservationist groups. Among those targeted by the criticisms were the timing of the project, which was implemented amidst the COVID-19 pandemic, and concerns of adverse environmental effects from the laying of dolomite on the polluted Manila Bay.

Use of public funds 
Three senators also voiced their opposition to the project: Nancy Binay, Risa Hontiveros and Francis "Kiko" Pangilinan. Binay cited the lack of public consultation on the project, as well as the lack of study regarding the effects of the use of dolomite sands. Both Hontiveros and Pangilinan argued that the funds for the project should have been used on public health and relief goods instead. Akbayan filed a case with the Supreme Court to penalize the Department of Environment and Natural Resources for pursuing the project, but the petition was junked.

When asked about the criticism that the money spent on the project could have been better spent on the response to the COVID-19 pandemic, Presidential spokesman Harry Roque said that he did not "buy that argument" because caring for the people's mental health is also needed, pointing out that if people are to visit the beach, the mental health effects on them cannot be quantified.

Laying of crush dolomite 

The University of the Philippines Marine Science Institute (MSI) disapproved of the laying of crushed dolomite sand for the creation of the beach, saying that this will not improve the water quality in Manila Bay and that a continuous replenishment of the sand would be expensive. The UP Institute of Biology said that using mangroves instead of crushed dolomite rock would be better for rehabilitation, adding that the International Union for Conservation of Nature prefers this as an effective nature-based solution. Undersecretary Antiporda did not agree with the suggestion of the UP Marine Science Institute, calling them paid hacks, and that being from a state university the state should not be paying them. Antiporda said that the government has paid UP "half a billion pesos" for consultations. Laura David, the director of UP MSI, said that the university charged the government just over 364 million pesos. Antiporda later apologized for his statement, calling UP's criticism "painful"; David accepted Antiporda's apology, and called the back and forth a "misunderstanding".

See also 
 Baseco Beach

References 

2020 controversies
2020 establishments in the Philippines
Beaches of Metro Manila
Duterte administration controversies
Manila Bay
Tourist attractions in Manila
Urban beaches
Outdoor structures in the Philippines